Ninaivugal is a 1984 Indian Tamil-language film co-edited and directed by M. Velaisamy and written by A. L. Narayanan. The fiilm stars Sripriya, Karthik, Radha and Sarath Babu. It was released on 9 June 1984.

Plot 

The story is about how a woman faces problems in different stages of her life.

Cast 
Radha
Sripriya
Karthik
Sarath Babu
Thengai Srinivasan
Manorama
Pushpalatha

Soundtrack 
The music was composed by Shankar–Ganesh.

Reception 
Jayamanmadhan of Kalki felt the film was like a serial story that started without a proper plan, there is nothing like reminiscing in the twisting and twisting of the story, even if it is not tiring while watching it and concluded despite the title which never change as the scent of a past life, it's a film without lagging.

References

External links 
 

1980s Tamil-language films
1984 films
Films scored by Shankar–Ganesh